Usko is the given name of the following people:

Usko Kemppi (1907–1994), Finnish composer and author
Usko Meriläinen (1930–2004), Finnish composer
Usko Nghaamwa, Namibian politician
Usko Nyström (1861–1925), Finnish architect
Usko Santavuori (1922–2003), Finnish sensationalist radio reporter

See also
Estadio Hanz Usko, stadium in Guazapa, El Salvador

Finnish masculine given names